Otocinclus is a genus of catfish in the family Loricariidae native to South America, commonly known as "dwarf suckers" or "otos". This genus, like other loricariids, is characterized by rows of armour plating covering the body, as well as the underslung suckermouth. They are generally small in size; O. tapirape is the smallest of the species (2.4 cm), while O. flexilis is the biggest (5.5 cm). These species have adaptations that allow them to breathe air. A duct forms at the junction between the esophagus and the stomach and expands into an enlarged, ring-like diverticulum, characteristic of this genus, which allows air-breathing. Otocinclus are popular aquarium fish, and they are often purchased as algae eaters. It is difficult to breed them in captivity, and only wild caught Otocinclus are available to hobbyists. This genus is widely distributed east of the Andes of South America, throughout the lowlands from northern Venezuela to northern Argentina, but are generally absent from the Amazon and the Orinoco lowlands.

Etymology
The Otocinclus name is derived from the Greek oto, meaning ear and the Latin cinclus, meaning a latticework, an allusion to the holes in the head in the region of the ear.

Taxonomy
Otocinclus is the most basal genus of the tribe Hypoptopomatini of the subfamily Hypoptopomatinae. However, phylogenetic relationships are currently under study and this genus may eventually be relocated. Its monophyly is supported by seven derived features. O. batmani, O. bororo, O cocama, O. huaorani, O. mariae and O. mura form a monophyletic group within this genus. A monophyletic group is also formed by O. flexilis, O. mimulus and O. xakriaba, which all share mimicry as a synapomorphy.

Species
There are currently 19 recognized species in this genus:

Otocinclus arnoldi Regan, 1909
 Otocinclus batmani Lehmann A., 2006 
 Otocinclus bororo Schaefer, 1997
 Otocinclus caxarari Schaefer, 1997
 Otocinclus cocama R. E. dos Reis, 2004
 Otocinclus flexilis Cope, 1894 
 Otocinclus hasemani Steindachner, 1915
 Otocinclus hoppei A. Miranda-Ribeiro, 1939
 Otocinclus huaorani Schaefer, 1997
 Otocinclus juruenae A. C. Ribeiro & Lehmann A., 2016 
 Otocinclus macrospilus C. H. Eigenmann & W. R. Allen, 1942
 Otocinclus mangaba Lehmann A., Mayer & R. E. dos Reis, 2010 
 Otocinclus mariae Fowler, 1940
 Otocinclus mimulus Axenrot & S. O. Kullander, 2003 
 Otocinclus mura Schaefer, 1997
 Otocinclus tapirape M. R. Britto & C. L. R. Moreira, 2002
 Otocinclus vestitus Cope, 1872
 Otocinclus vittatus Regan, 1904
 Otocinclus xakriaba Schaefer, 1997

Macrotocinclus affinus was considered to be a member of Otocinclus until it was moved to its own monotypic genus, Macrotocinclus. The name Otocinclus affinus is still used in the aquarium trade, however it actually refers to members of O. vittatus, O. vestitus and O. macrospilus.

Ecology
Species of this genus are diurnal and generally are found in small streams or along the margins of larger rivers, clinging to substrates using their suckermouth. The fish of this genus primarily feed on algae or aufwuchs on roots, stones, macrophytes and broad-leaved grasses. They inhabit well-oxygenated, moderate- to slow-flowing environments, often near river banks. They are found near the surface of the water, but are often associated with vegetation or other structures. They lay adhesive eggs and do not guard them; this is in contrast to many other loricariids where the male builds a nest and guards the eggs. These fish live in shoals or schools. Otocinclus are able to breathe air. Prior to surfacing, they will release air through their gills and mouth. Upon returning to the bottom, the fish do not need to pump their buccal cavities, indicating they are absorbing oxygen from the swallowed air.

O. flexilis, O. mimulus and O. xakriaba are considered to be Batesian mimics of certain Corydoras species (C. diphyes, C. garbei, C. nattereri and C. paleatus, respectively). These Corydoras species have bony plates of armor and strong spines as defenses, making them less palatable; by mimicking these species in size and coloration, Otocinclus spp. avoid predation.

References

Hypoptopomatini
Fish of South America
Catfish genera
Taxa named by Edward Drinker Cope
Freshwater fish genera